Urodeta aculeata is a moth of the family Elachistidae. It is found in Cameroon.

The wingspan is about 6.3 mm. The thorax, tegula and forewing are grey brown, mottled with blackish brown tipped scales. The hindwings are brownish grey. Adults have been recorded in the beginning of May.

Etymology
The species name is derived from the Latin aculeatus (meaning provided with prickles) and refers to the numerous cornuti.

References

Endemic fauna of Cameroon
Elachistidae
Moths described in 2011
Insects of Cameroon
Moths of Africa